Schauenburg is a municipality in Germany.

Schauenburg may also refer to: 
 Balthazar Alexis Henri Schauenburg, a French general who served in the wars of the French Revolution and the Empire.
 Maximilien Joseph Schauenburg, a French officer during the colonial conquest of Algeria.

See also
 Schaumburg (disambiguation)